Madeleine Céliat was a French stage and film actress of the silent era. She appeared in nearly thirty French and Italian films during the 1910s.

Madeleine Céliat is the Pseudonym of Marie-Madelaine Coquelle, she married the writer Max Fischer, on May 10, 1926 in Paris.

Selected filmography
 Messaline (1910)
 Monna Vanna (1915)

References

Bibliography
 Claude Aziza. Le péplum: l'Antiquité au cinéma. Corlet, 1998.

External links

 Madeleine Céliat « La Rampe » 7 décembre 1919
 Madeleine Céliat « La Revue hebdomadaire : romans, histoire, voyages » 1912

Year of birth unknown
Year of death unknown
French stage actresses
French film actresses